Browndown Halt railway station served the town of Gosport, Hampshire, England from 1894 to 1930 on the Lee-on-the-Solent Railway.

History 
The station opened on 12 May 1894 by the Lee-on-the-Solent Railway. It was situated on the south side of Portsmouth Road, near a military training area. This was the busiest halt on the line due to the armed forces using the training grounds nearby, although it was also the only halt that had no waiting shelter. The station closed temporarily on 31 August 1914 but reopened on 1 October 1914. It later closed again to passengers and goods traffic on 1 May 1930.

References

External links 

Disused railway stations in Hampshire
Railway stations in Great Britain opened in 1894
Railway stations in Great Britain closed in 1930
1894 establishments in England
1930 disestablishments in England